In probability a quasi-stationary distribution is a random process that admits one or several absorbing states that are reached almost surely, but is initially distributed such that it can evolve for a long time without reaching it. The most common example is the evolution of a population: the only equilibrium  is when there is no one left, but if we model the number of people it is likely to remain stable for a long period of time before it eventually collapses.

Formal definition 
We denote by  the family of distributions where  has original condition . We assume that  is almost surely reached, i.e. .

In particular

General results

Killing time 

From the assumptions above we know that the killing time is finite with probability 1. A stronger result than we can derive is that the killing time is exponentially distributed: if  is a QSD then there exists  such that .

Moreover, for any  we get .

Existence of a quasi-stationary distribution 

Most of the time the question asked is whether a QSD exists or not in a given framework. From the previous results we can derive a condition necessary to this existence.

Let .

Moreover, from the previous paragraph, if  is a QSD then . As  a consequence, if  satisfies  then there can be no QSD  such that  because other wise this would lead to the contradiction .

A sufficient condition for a QSD to exist is given considering the transition semigroup  of the process before killing. Then, under the conditions that  is a compact Hausdorff space and that  preserves the set of continuous functions, i.e. , there exists a QSD.

History 
The works of Wright on gene frequency in 1931 and of Yaglom on branching processes in 1947 already included the idea of such distributions. The term quasi-stationarity applied to biological systems was then used by Bartlett in 1957, who later coined "quasi-stationary distribution".

Quasi-stationary distributions were also part of the classification of killed processes given by Vere-Jones in 1962 and their definition for finite state Markov chains was done in 1965 by Darroch and Seneta.

Examples 
Quasi-stationary distributions can be used to model the following processes:
 Evolution of a population by the number of people: the only equilibrium is when there is no one left.
 Evolution of a contagious disease in a population by the number of people ill: the only equilibrium is when the disease disappears.
 Transmission of a gene: in case of several competing alleles we measure the number of people who have one and the absorbing state is when everybody has the same.
 Voter model: where everyone influences a small set of neighbors and opinions propagate, we study how many people vote for a particular party and an equilibrium is reached only when the party has no voter, or the whole population voting for it.

References 

Stochastic processes